Delaware Township is one of twelve townships in Delaware County, Indiana. According to the 2010 census, its population was 3,481 and it contained 1,591 housing units.

Geography

Cities and towns
 Albany (south half)

Unincorporated towns
 DeSoto

Adjacent townships
 Niles Township (north)
 Richland Township, Jay County (northeast)
 Green Township, Randolph County (east)
 Monroe Township, Randolph County (southeast)
 Liberty Township (south)
 Center Township (southwest)
 Hamilton Township (west)
 Union Township (northwest)

Major highways
  Indiana State Road 28
  Indiana State Road 67
  Indiana State Road 167

Cemeteries
The township contains four cemeteries: Black, Godlove, Strong and Union.

Demographics

2020 census
As of the census of 2020,  there were 3,481 people, 1,591 households, and 814 families living in the township. The racial makeup of the township was 95.3% White, 0.6% African American, 0.4% Native American or Alaskan Native, 0.3% Asian, 0.03% Native Hawaiian or Pacific Islander, 0.4% from other races, and 2.8% from two or more races. Hispanic or Latino of any race were 1.0% of the population.

There were 1,591 households, of which 21.7% had children under the age of 18 living with them, 50.8% were married couples living together, 30.8% had a female householder with no husband present, 15.1% had a male householder with no wife present, and 3.3% were non-families. 45.9% of all households were made up of individuals. The average household size was 2.19 and the average family size was 2.86.

26.8% of the population had never been married. 52.6% of residents were married and not separated, 7.8% were widowed, 10.6% were divorced, and 2.3% were separated.

The median age in the township was 45.9. 5.9% of residents were under the age of 5; 21.7% of residents were under the age of 18; 78.3% were age 18 or older; and 22.7% were age 65 or older. 11.2% of the population were veterans.

The most common language spoken at home was English with 99.6% speaking it at home and 0.4% spoke Spanish at home. 0.9% of the population were foreign born.

The median household income in Delaware Township was $51,714, 7.9% lower than the median average for the state of Indiana. 14.4% of the population were in poverty, including 31.1% of residents under the age of 18.

See also
List of Indiana townships

References
 
 United States Census Bureau cartographic boundary files

External links
 Indiana Township Association
 United Township Association of Indiana

Townships in Delaware County, Indiana
Townships in Indiana